Við Djúpið was an annual music festival and a series of summer courses held in the Westfjords of Iceland around summer solstice. The event offered a series of concerts and master classes.

The festival offered master classes and concerts with artists such as the cellist Erling Blöndal Bengtsson and pianist Vovka Ashkenazy with the Pacifica Quartet. Evan Ziporyn, clarinettist, composer and a member of the renowned band Bang on a Can gave a master class and concert in Ísafjörður during Við Djúpið 2007. Among performers at the 2008 festival were Pekka Kuusisto, violinist with Simon Crawford-Phillips, pianist and Håkon Austbø, pianist.

The festival took place in Ísafjörður and surroundings where music has been part of daily life for a long time. Ísafjörður Music School was the main venue of the festival as well as Rögnvaldur Ólafsson's Art School, which offers great new venues in the Edinborg house.

The master classes were held in close cooperation with the Iceland Academy of the Arts, and are accredited by its Department of Music.

Specific years

2006
June 20–25 

Sigrún Hjálmtýsdóttir, soprano and Anna Guðný Guðmundsdóttir pianist taught a masterclass and gave a concert. Peter Máté, pianist and Guðrún S. Birgisdóttir, flutist taught a master class. Concerts were also given by pianist Tinna Þorsteinsdóttir and the Icelandic jazz-trio Flís.

2007
June 19–24

Erling Blöndal Bengtsson, cellist and Vovka Ashkenazy, pianist held master classes and concerts. 
A master class in Balinesian music led by Evan Ziporyn, clarinetist, composer, and member of the renowned band "Bang on a Can", and Christine Southworth, gamelan musician. The young and inventive Icelandic jazz pianist Davíð Þór Jónsson taught piano improvisation. The Icelandic experimental modern music group Aton appeared in two concerts, one of them a special Midsummernight's concert, which was broadcast nationwide by the Icelandic National Broadcasting Service (RÚV).

2008
June 17–23

In the classical department, the artists who we proudly presented were: Pekka Kuusisto, violinist with Simon Crawford-Phillips, pianist as well as Norwegian pianist Håkon Austbø. There was an opera workshop led by Hanna Dóra Sturludóttir, soprano and conductor/pianist Kurt Kopecky. Violinist Una Sveinbjarnardóttir taught a chamber music course and a violin course. The jazz sector featured jazz pianist Agnar Már Magnússon who led a class in piano improvisation. Other performers were Anna Guðný Guðmunsdóttir, pianist, Berglind María Tómasdóttir, flutist and Tinna Þorsteinsdóttir, pianist.

Management
The festival was first introduced by flutist Guðrún Birgisdóttir and guitarist Pétur Jónasson. They managed the festival – the first 3 years. In 2004 pianist Tinna Þorsteinsdóttir took over the artistic leadership of the festival and Greipur Gíslason joined as managing director. Tinna led 3 festivals but Greipur stayed on.

References

External link

Music festivals in Iceland
Westfjords
Annual events in Iceland
Classical music festivals in Iceland
Summer events in Iceland